The 2nd Motorised Brigade was a formation of the Royal Hungarian Army that participated in the Axis invasion of Yugoslavia during World War II.

Organization 
Structure of the brigade:

 Headquarters
 2nd Armoured Reconnaissance Battalion
 4th Battalion, 2nd Motorized Infantry Regiment
 5th Battalion, 2nd Motorized Infantry Regiment
 6th Battalion, 2nd Motorized Infantry Regiment
 11th Bicycle Infantry Battalion
 12th Bicycle Infantry Regiment
 2nd Motorized Artillery Battalion
 2nd Motorized Anti-Aircraft Battery
 2nd Motorized Engineer Company
 2nd Motorized Bridging Engineer Company
 2nd Motorized Signal Company
 2nd Motorized Traffic Control Signal Company
 2nd Motorized Brigade Service Regiment

Commanders 
 Brigade General Ödön Zay (1 Oct 1938 - 15 Jan 1939)
 Colonel Sándor Horváth (15 Jan 1939 - 1 Mar 1940)
 Brigade General József Heszlényi (1 Mar 1940 - 29 Oct 1940)
 Brigade General János Vörös (29 Oct 1940 - 1 Dec 1940)
 Colonel Ferenc Bisza (1 Dec 1940 - 1 Oct 1941)

Notes

References
 

Military units and formations of Hungary in World War II